The Greek Shepherd or Greek Sheepdog (Greek: Ελληνικός Ποιμενικός, Ellinikós Pimenikós) is a breed of livestock guardian dog from Greece. Thought to be ancient in origin, the Greek Shepherd is very closely related to livestock guardian dog breeds from neighbouring countries; it is believed that some dogs are simultaneously claimed to be other breeds as they migrate annually across national borders with the flocks they protect in search seasonal pastures.

History 
It is believed livestock guardian dogs are one of the oldest distinct dog types, with evidence the type has remained largely unchanged since ancient times. It is claimed the Greek Shepherd has been found in Greece since ancient times, Plato wrote of dogs of similar form and function being known in the region of Epirus as early as 800 BC. The Greek Shepherd is known as the Ellinikós Pimenikós (Ελληνικός Ποιμενικός) in Greek, it has been called the Greek Shepherd Dog, the Greek Sheepdog and the Hellenic Shepherd Dog. The breed is found throughout Greece, particularly in the north of the country; it is very closely related to other livestock guardian breeds found throughout the Balkans.

Many Balkan shepherds and their flocks undertake an annual migration between Greece and the Šar Mountains to capitalise on summer mountain pastures but avoid the harsh snow-covered mountain winters when no feed is available, in 1977 it was estimated over 500,000 sheep made this annual migration. Because these same dogs can be seen in multiple countries at different times of the years, some cynologists including Raymond Coppinger observe that many dogs claimed to be Greek Shepherd are in fact also claimed to be Šarplaninacs and other regional breeds; and that nationalistic kennel clubs have given separate identities and breed standards to the very same dogs, differing appearances being due to changing appearance of these dogs as they gain their heavier winter coats and shed them again for the heat of the summer. Typically these shepherds winter their flocks in Greece where their Greek Shepherds protect the flocks from Greek wolves and jackals; then as the weather improves they walk with their flocks, accompanied by their dogs, over  through North Macedonia to their summer pastures in the Šar Mountains on the border of Albania and Kosovo where their Šarplaninacs protect their flocks from predators found there; then in the autumn they make the return journey to Greece where their dogs once again transform into Greek Shepherds.

Description

Appearance 
The Greek Shepherd is a large breed of dog that closely resembles the Italian Maremmano-Abruzzese Sheepdog, the Hungarian Kuvasz and the Polish Tatra Shepherd Dog; the breed displays the traits common to most livestock guardian dog breeds, including a thick weatherproof double-coat and a powerful build.

The breed has a dense double-coat; it has never been bred for colour and can be found in a broad range of colours, including white, black, brown, light-brown or a combination of these, with spotted examples being common. In some areas, only pure white examples are kept by local shepherds, with non-white puppies being culled because it is thought they bring bad luck.

In former times, many Greek shepherds would crop the right ear of their dogs, believing doing so improved the dogs' hearing; this practice gave the dogs a curious, lopsided appearance.

Character 
The breed is renowned for its ferocity when guarding flocks, with dogs sometimes taking it upon themselves to protect the whole countryside as opposed to their master's flocks; people walking in some rural areas, even shepherds, often needed to arm themselves with sticks and rocks to ward off shepherd dogs who could mistake them for thieves. A heavy log is often tied to the collars of particularly aggressive animals, being believed the extra exertion curbs the animal's zealotry.

Molossus of Epirus 

The Kennel Club of Greece recognises a second breed of Greek livestock guardian dog, the Molossus of Epirus, from the region of Epirus. The kennel club's breed standard for the Molossus of Epirus describes a breed with very similar characteristics as the Greek Shepherd; the principle differences are in colour, it stating the Molossus of Epirus should be solid red, blonde, yellow or black, striped and wolf or deer colour with a minimal patch of white on the chest.

See also 

 Dogs portal
 List of dog breeds

References 

Dog breeds originating in Greece
Livestock guardian dogs